Risella is a genus of sea snails, marine gastropod mollusks in the family Littorinidae, the winkles or periwinkles.

Species
Species within the genus Risella include:

 Risella tantillus

References

 Nomenclator Zoologicus info

Littorinidae